is the fifth single by Japanese singer Kyary Pamyu Pamyu. It was released on March 20, 2013. The song is used as the theme song for the au "Full Control Tokyo" event commercials. The single was certified platinum by the RIAJ for PC downloads in April 2013. The song peaked at number one on Japan Hot 100, and became her first number one there. On April 19, 2014, limited editions of a 7' LP were released with A side:  Ninja Re Bang Bang-extended mix-, exclusive for DJs.

Track listing

Music video

Most references are taken from Natari.jp, which also shows pictures of the filming.

The music video was shot at the end of February in a studio in the Kanagawa prefecture. The filming was done completely in greenscreen, with 3D rendered computer graphics later added. Although the filming was mostly virtual, filming involved physical effects, such a trampoline for jumping scenes, a giant fan to simulate wind.

In the music video, Kyary alternates between two characters, a ninja and a princess. Choreographer Maiko described the dancing as 'completely ninja', with shuriken throwing motion, high jumps, while still keeping a feminine side while singing 'blooming petals are dancing'. The clothes styles for the ninja are 'black clothes' and 'women's trousers', with a katana and head band chosen by Kyary. Kyary additionally commented that the outfit was 'really cool, they should sell it in Harajuku'. The other character is the 'badly behaved princess', with an antique kimono in 'shocking pink' color and an ornate hairpin (kanzashi) made specially to Kyary's taste.

The opening scene shows Kyary riding on a Japanese koi fish with loving eyes, a pun on 'koi' which means love in the lyrics.

Kyary already referenced The Drifters' Hige dance in her music video for Pon Pon Pon. Ken Shimura from The Drifters and Yuuka have a similar character to the badly behaved princess, stupid princess Yuuka. In the episode of Ken Shimura's Stupid Lord (志村けんのバカ殿様) that aired on the 20th of February 2015, the Stupid Lord and Princess Yuuka had a skit where Princess Yuuka is dressed in shocking pink and plays Mottai Night Land on her CD player.

Personnel
Credits adapted from liner notes.
Yasutaka Nakata – written, arranged, produced, recorded, mixed, mastered
Steve Nakamura – art director, designer
Shinji Konishi – hair, make-up
Takeshi Hanzawa – photographer
Kumiko Iijima – stylist

Credits for the music video:
 Jun Tamukai - director
 Kumiko Iijima - stylist
 Choreography and motion captured dancing for the Fūjin, Raijin and robots - Maiko

In popular culture
"Ninja Re Bang Bang" is briefly heard in the 2016 American animated film, Sing, during which five red panda girls practice for their audition.
"Ninja Re Bang Bang" is on the tracklist for Just Dance Wii U.
"Ninja Re Bang Bang" is also featured in 2019 film, John Wick: Chapter 3 – Parabellum
A remix of this song by Steve Aoki titled "Ninja Re Bang Bang Steve Aoki Remix" is used as a theme song for the free-to-play video game Ninjala.

References

External links

2013 singles
Billboard Japan Hot 100 number-one singles
Songs written by Yasutaka Nakata
Kyary Pamyu Pamyu songs
Song recordings produced by Yasutaka Nakata
2013 songs
Unborde singles